Alpha-1,6-mannosyl-glycoprotein 4-beta-N-acetylglucosaminyltransferase (N-acetylglucosaminyltransferase VI, N-glycosyl-oligosaccharide-glycoprotein N-acetylglucosaminyltransferase VI, uridine diphosphoacetylglucosamine-glycopeptide beta-1->4-acetylglucosaminyltransferase VI, mannosyl-glycoprotein beta-1,4-N-acetylglucosaminyltransferase, GnTVI) is an enzyme with systematic name UDP-N-acetyl-D-glucosamine:2,6-bis(N-acetyl-beta-D-glucosaminyl)-alpha-D-mannosyl-glycoprotein 4-beta-N-acetyl-D-glucosaminyltransferase. This enzyme catalyses the following chemical reaction

 UDP-N-acetyl-D-glucosamine + 2,6-bis(N-acetyl-beta-D-glucosaminyl)-alpha-D-mannosyl-R  UDP + 2,4,6-tris(N-acetyl-beta-D-glucosaminyl)-alpha-D-mannosyl-R

R represents the remainder of the N-linked oligosaccharide in the glycoprotein acceptor.

References

External links 
 

EC 2.4.1